Forrest Pass is a broad ice-filled pass between Mount Bursey, in the Flood Range, and the southern elevations of the Ames Range in Marie Byrd Land, Antarctica. It was mapped by the United States Geological Survey from surveys and U.S. Navy air photos, 1959–65, and was named by the Advisory Committee on Antarctic Names for Robert B. Forrest, a United States Antarctic Research Program photogrammetrist, surveyor and Principal Investigator for a National Science Foundation Ice Movement Study, member of the Byrd Station Traverse of 1962–63.

References 

Mountain passes of Antarctica
Landforms of Marie Byrd Land